Woody Cornwell (1968-2016) was an American Abstract painter and co-founder of Eyedrum Art & Music Gallery in Atlanta during the late 1990s. Eyedrum, in that era, was instrumental in expanding the alternative art scene in Atlanta. He received a Bachelor degree from Savannah College of Art and Design (SCAD) graduating Magna Cum Laude and a Master's degree in Fine Arts from Georgia State University.

In 1997, Woody with a group of friends co-founded Eyedrum Art & Music Gallary in Atlanta where he curated art exhibits and mentored young artists in the city. In addition he taught art at the Atlanta college of Art, SCAD Atlanta, Callenwalde Art Center and Chastain Art Center and the Telefair Museum in Atlanta. He was a board member of Art Pages Magazine. He was part of the selection committee at Forward Arts Foundation for their Emerging Artist Award.

Woody Cornwell's art has been shown at the Swan Coach House Gallery, Vaknin Schwarz Gallery, Jacksonville Museum of Modern Art, and the Suzanne Randolph Fine Art. His work is also published in new American Paintings, Volume 8,#3. In Atlanta he was represented by the Sandler Hudson Gallery.

Childhood

Woody was born in Newberry, SC on January 13, 1968. He grew up in Macon, Georgia., Anderson, South Carolina, and Dalton, Georgia with his parents, Elaine & Woody Sr., and his younger brother Mark. Woody was a natural artist who impressed his parents, Woody Sr. & Elaine Cornwell, with his drawings at a very early age. He grew up a boy scout and an avid adventure seeker.

Career

Woody's art career started in Dalton Ga. when he was commissioned by the local high school for a spirit mural in the common area and a pencil drawing of the school itself. After high school and a brief enrollment at the University of Georgia, Woody followed his passion and enrolled at the Savannah College of Art & Design. After graduation from SCAD Woody moved to Atlanta, enrolled at Georgia State University, and began to lay the groundwork for his first gallery venture. 
Soon Woody and his roommate Marshal Avett founded the Silver Ceiling Gallery in their own apartment. After a few years of show at Silver Ceiling, Woody and Marshal convinced a handful of friends to create an art collective a few doors down from Silver Ceiling. In 1997, Eyedrum Art & Music Gallery was founded. It was a collective effort where each board member took responsibility for rent although no one lived there. Their ambitious venture paid off in a golden era of experimental art and music that lasted well into the 00's before changes began to distance Woody from the gallery.

The Atlanta arts scene provided some trying times. In an article in Creative Loafing Woody was described a "Hustler."

In Atlanta Woody was represented by Sandler Hudson Gallery and also was an important player in the first years of the Norton Arts Center in Hapeville Ga. Reproductions and news of future shows of original works is found at WoodyCornwellArt

Exhibitions
2013, Norton Street Gallary, Atlanta, GA. - "It's Mutual"
2003, Jacksonville Museum of Modern Art, Jacksonville, FL
2003/02 City Hall East, Atlanta, GA
2002 Sandler Hudson Gallery, Atlanta, GANew American Paintings, (2003), Vol. 8, Num. 3. (p. 37). The Open Studios Press, Boston MA. www.newamericanpaintings.com
Nations Bank Plaza, Barkin-Leeds, Atlanta, GA
2001 Swan Coach House Gallery, Atlanta, GA
Spruill Center for the Arts, Atlanta, GA
Lenox Art Walk, Atlanta, GA
2000 Vaknin/Schwarz Gallery, Atlanta, GA

Collections
Jacksonville Museum of Modern Art, Jacksonville, FL
Lucinda Bunnen, Atlanta, GA
Neiman Marcus, Atlanta, GA
Office Worx, Atlanta, GA
Georgia State University, Atlanta, GA
Savannah College of Art and Design, Savannah, GA

Publications
2002 Creative Loafing, 6-19-02; 8/15-01; 5-12-00; 2-12-00
Atlanta Journal-Constitution, 6-7-02; 8-17-01; 8-8-00
Jezebel, 9-2000

References

1968 births
2016 deaths
20th-century American painters
21st-century American painters
People from Newberry County, South Carolina